The 2005 Italian Formula Three Championship was the 41st Italian Formula Three Championship season. It began on 17 April at Adria and ended on 23 October at Misano after twelve races.

Luigi Ferrara of Corbetta Competizioni finished almost all races on podium position, including three wins at Imola, Monza and Misano to clinch the title. He finished nine points clear of Team Ghinzani driver Alexander Müller, who won race at Vallelunga, a race at Imola, both races at Mugello, race at Adria and the season-ending race at Misano. Third place went to Lucidi Motors driver Paolo Maria Nocera, who took three victories at Adria, Varano and Monza.

Teams and drivers
All teams were Italian-registered and all cars competed on Michelin tyres.

Calendar
All rounds were held in Italy.

Standings
Points are awarded as follows:

References

External links
 Official website

Italian Formula Three Championship seasons
Formula Three
Italian
Italian Formula 3 Championship